The Banu Jusham were a large sub-tribe in the Arabian Peninsula during the time of Mohammed. According to genealogists and various oral traditions, they are the descendants of Jusham ibn Sa'd ibn Bakr ibn Hawazin.

Branches 
The main tribes that constituted this sub-tribe were as follows:

Banu Ghazia 
invading And the Gazans are an independent tribe, their largest and their homes were with their people in Sarawat between Tihama and Najd, and after Islam, it spread in Iraq and the Maghreb, and the main stomachs of Gaza are:  

Otaiba bin Ghazia 

Jada'a bin Ghazia 

Atwara bin Ghazia 

Hami bin Ghazia 

As for Otaiba, among them was Obaidullah bin Ramahs, Juda’a, among whom was Duraid bin Al-Samma, and Atwara, among whom was Hanak bin Thabet, the poet and the knight who participated in the cloudy day on Kinana.

Bani Asima 
They are Banu Usaima bin Jashem, and they are two branches:  

Buni kaeb 

Buni eaqaba 

Among them is the companion of Abdullah bin Masoud, and he is Abu Al-Ahwas Awf bin Malik, and among them is the poet Rifa’a bin Darraj Al-Asmy and the companion Malik bin Nadla

Banu Uday

Bani Amer

Bani Eshan

Notable members
Dorayd bin Al Soma

References

Tribes of Arabia
Hawazin